Terminal lucidity, also known as paradoxical lucidity, rallying or the rally, is an unexpected return of mental clarity and memory, or suddenly regained consciousness that occurs in the time shortly before death in patients with severe psychiatric or neurological disorders. This condition has been reported by physicians since the 19th century.

History 
Several case reports in the 19th century described the unusual condition of an improvement and recovery of the mental state in patients days or weeks before death. William Munk, for instance, in 1887 called the phenomenon "lucidity before death". According to historical reviews headed by the biologist Michael Nahm, who also has an interest in mediumship and near-death experiences, the phenomena have been noted in patients with diseases which cause progressive cognitive impairment, such as Alzheimer's disease, but also schizophrenia, tumors, strokes, meningitis, and Parkinson's disease. However, terminal lucidity is not currently listed as a medical term.

According to Nahm, it may be present even in cases of patients with previous mental disability. Nahm defines two subtypes: one that comes gradually (a week before death), and another that comes rapidly (hours before death), with the former occurring more often than the latter. There may be plenty of cases reported in literature, although the phrase terminal lucidity was coined in 2009. Interest in this condition, which dwindled during the 20th century, has been reignited by further studies. A 2020 research screened for what the authors preferred to call "paradoxical lucidity", a general term for unexpected remissions in dementias, independent of whether it followed a terminality process or not; it found strong association of the condition as a near-death phenomenon and stated that it can overlap the concept of "terminal lucidity" in some cases. Such a paradoxical condition is considered a challenge to the irreversibility paradigm of chronic degenerative dementias such as Alzheimer's.

Causes 
The earliest attempt at explanation was issued by Benjamin Rush in 1812, which proposed the hypothesis that a reawakening could be due to a nervous excitation caused by pain or fever, or else because of dead blood vessels, released by a leakage of water in the brain chambers. Johannes Friedreich, in 1839, proposed that the factors causing impairments may be reversed shortly before death, analogous to the reabsorption in terminal patients with hydrocephalus, and that high fever may be a cause of it. According to Macleod (2009) in his observations, explanative causes could not be found for the variety of cases, but it was suggested that due to the modern pharmacology in terminal cases, the condition may be less common today. A recent proposed mechanism includes a non-tested hypothesis of neuromodulation, according to which near-death discharges of neurotransmitters and corticotropin-releasing peptides act upon preserved circuits of the medial prefrontal cortex and hippocampus, promoting memory retrieval and mental clarity.

References

Medical aspects of death
Dementia
Mental states
19th century in medicine
2009 neologisms